John Bartlett (born John David Bartlett; 17 March 1948) is an Australian former tennis player who was a Davis Cup member and top ten player, in Australia in the 1970s.

Career
His career highlights include winning the "All Japan Indoors" in 1969 and the Egyptian Open Doubles with John Marks and twice qualifying for the ATP World Doubles Finals. He also has wins over many top players including Arthur Ashe.  Bartlett, a right-handed player, was an original member of the ATP and in the 1970s an action photo of him playing was included into the International Hall Of Fame in Newport, Rhode Island. Bartlett was also the first Yonex contract Professional. After retiring from his tennis career, Bartlett has involved himself in the following ventures;

Bartlett headed up a program for the ATP in 1979 to introduce prize money into the qualifying events in Europe. Partnered by his wife, they organised over $100,000 in prize money by switching the qualifying events to other towns 50 km away.  This has led to many ATP tournaments being formed. John Bartlett was also the SE Asian Manager and Australian director for Penn Racquet Sports.
Bartlett developed and distributed his own tennis ball "The Bartlett Tennis Ball" before encountering political difficulties with Tennis Australia. Bartlett currently is working as tennis analyst for SEN Sports Radio Melbourne and also headed up their live commentary team for the 2011 Australian Open.

Career finals

Doubles (1 win)

Junior Grand Slam titles

Doubles: 1

External links
 
 

1948 births
Living people
Australian businesspeople
Australian male tennis players
Australian radio personalities
Australian tennis commentators
Sportspeople from Wollongong
Tennis people from New South Wales
People from Brighton, Victoria
Radio personalities from Melbourne